Butler is the name of some places in the U.S. state of Wisconsin:

Butler, Clark County, Wisconsin, a town
Butler, Waukesha County, Wisconsin, a village

pt:Butler (Wisconsin)